Donald Alan Schlitz Jr. (born August 29, 1952) is an American country music songwriter. For his songwriting efforts, Schlitz has earned two Grammy Awards, as well as four ASCAP Country Songwriter of the Year awards.

In 1993, he was inducted into the Nashville Songwriters Hall of Fame. Later in 2012, he was inducted into the Songwriters Hall of Fame. Furthermore, in 2017, he was inducted into the Country Music Hall of Fame. During the Saturday night broadcast on June 11, 2022, Schlitz was invited by Vince Gill to become a member of the Grand Ole Opry. He was officially inducted on August 30, 2022.

Songwriting career
Schlitz' first hit as a songwriter was Kenny Rogers's "The Gambler", which became a crossover country hit upon its release in 1978, later becoming one of Rogers's signature songs. Since then, Schlitz has written numerous country songs and penned several hits for other country artists. Among his biggest hits are two Number One songs which he co-wrote with Paul Overstreet, "Forever and Ever, Amen" by Randy Travis and "When You Say Nothing at All" by Keith Whitley. He has 24 number 1 hits on the Country Charts.

United States President George H. W. Bush also commissioned Schlitz to write a theme song for his "Points of Light" program. This song, "Point of Light", was a No. 3 country hit for Randy Travis in 1991.

Schlitz also worked with Kenny Rogers again in 1998. Rogers joked at the time that "every 20 years I will record a Don Schlitz song". The result was a baseball-themed hit single called "`The Greatest". Rogers also recorded several more of his songs in 2013 for his best-selling You Can't Make Old Friends album.

Musicals 
He composed the music for the musical The Adventures of Tom Sawyer.

Recordings
In addition to writing hit singles for other artists, Schlitz has recorded three albums of his own. The first, titled Dreamers' Matinee, was released in 1980 on Capitol Records. A live compilation, titled Live at the Bluebird Café, was released in 2001. In 2010, Schlitz released another studio album of new material, Allergic to Crazy.

Singles

Singles co-written by Don Schlitz

Singles written or co-written by Don Schlitz include the following. Asterisks denote songs which reached Number One on the U.S. Billboard country charts.

"40 Hour Week (For a Livin')" by Alabama*
"Almost Goodbye" by Mark Chesnutt*
"And So It Goes" by Nitty Gritty Dirt Band with John Denver
"Ball and Chain" by Paul Overstreet
"The Battle Hymn of Love" by Kathy Mattea and Tim O'Brien
"The Center of My Universe" by The Bellamy Brothers
"Cheatin'" by Sara Evans
"Crazy from the Heart" by The Bellamy Brothers
"Crying Shame" by Michael Johnson
"Daddy's Come Around" by Paul Overstreet*
"Deeper Than the Holler" by Randy Travis*
"Didn't We Shine" by Waylon Jennings
"Forever and Ever, Amen" by Randy Travis*
"The Gambler" by Kenny Rogers
"Give Me Wings" by Michael Johnson*
"Good as I Was to You" by Lorrie Morgan
"The Greatest" by Kenny Rogers
"Guardian Angels" by The Judds
"He Thinks He'll Keep Her" by Mary Chapin Carpenter
"Heart of the Matter" by The Kendalls (1980), Loretta Lynn (1983)
"Heroes and Friends" by Randy Travis
"Houston Solution" by Ronnie Milsap
"I Could Be Persuaded" by The Bellamy Brothers
"I Feel Lucky" by Mary Chapin Carpenter
"I Know Where I'm Going" by The Judds*
"I Take My Chances" by Mary Chapin Carpenter
"I Think About It All the Time" by John Berry
"I Think About You" by Collin Raye
"I Watched It All (On My Radio)" by Lionel Cartwright
"I Won't Take Less Than Your Love" by Tanya Tucker with Paul Overstreet and Paul Davis*
"If I Could Bottle This Up" by Paul Overstreet
"If I Never See Midnight Again" by Sweethearts of the Rodeo
"If You Can Do Anything Else" by George Strait
"I'll Be Lovin' You" by Lee Greenwood
"In Terms of Love" by SHeDAISY
"Learning to Live Again" by Garth Brooks
"Leaving's Not an Option" by Chris Cummings
"Like Father Like Son" by Lionel Cartwright
"Long Shot" by Baillie & the Boys
"Looking for a Sign" by Chris Cummings
"Loved Too Much" by Ty Herndon
"Midnight Girl/Sunset Town" by Sweethearts of the Rodeo
"My Arms Stay Open All Night" by Tanya Tucker
"Not Too Much to Ask" by Mary Chapin Carpenter with Joe Diffie
"Oh Heart" by Baillie & the Boys
"Old School" by John Conlee
"On the Other Hand" by Randy Travis*
"One Promise Too Late" by Reba McEntire*
"Point of Light" by Randy Travis
"Richest Man on Earth" by Paul Overstreet
"The River and the Highway" by Pam Tillis
"Ready and Waiting" by Deborah Allen
"Rockin' with the Rhythm of the Rain" by The Judds*
"Satisfy You" by Sweethearts of the Rodeo
"Say What's in Your Heart by Restless Heart
"Say Yes" by Dusty Drake
"She Deserves You" by Baillie & the Boys
"Sowin' Love" by Paul Overstreet
"Stand a Little Rain" by Nitty Gritty Dirt Band
"Strong Enough to Bend" by Tanya Tucker*
"True Heart" by The Oak Ridge Boys
"Turn It Loose" by The Judds*
"When You Say Nothing at All" by Keith Whitley* (later covered by Alison Krauss & Union Station and Ronan Keating. Keating's version was in the film Notting Hill, and made it to number one on the British charts.)
"Why They Call It Falling" by Lee Ann Womack
"You Again" by The Forester Sisters*
"You'll Never Be Sorry" by The Bellamy Brothers

Awards
 1979 – Country Music Association – Song of the Year (The Gambler)
 1979 – Grammy – Country Song of the Year (The Gambler)
 1986 – Country Music Association – Song of the Year (On the Other Hand)
 1986 – Academy of Country Music – Song of the Year (On the Other Hand)
 1986 – Nashville Songwriters Association International—Song of the Year (On the Other Hand)
 1987 – Country Music Association – Song of the Year (Forever and Ever, Amen)
 1988 – Grammy – Country Song of the Year (Forever and Ever, Amen)
 1988–1991 – ASCAP – Country Songwriter of the Year
 2010 – Inducted into the North Carolina Music Hall of Fame.
 2017 – Inducted into the Country Music Hall of Fame

References

1952 births
Living people
Musicians from Durham, North Carolina
Country musicians from North Carolina
Country Music Hall of Fame inductees
American country singer-songwriters
Grammy Award winners
Singer-songwriters from North Carolina